Madame Auguste Cuoq is a mid 19th century portrait by French artist Gustave Courbet. Done in oil on canvas, the painting depicts Mathilde Desportes (Madame Auguste Cuoq), a French model who often sat for portraits. The painting is in the collection of the Metropolitan Museum of Art.

Description
Courbet painted Madame some time between 1852 and 1857, later showing it at an exhibition of his in 1867. The subject of the portrait, the titular Madame Auguste Cuoq, was painted by several notable artists, including Courbet and Jean-Jacques Henner. Notably, Cuoq's husband rejected the portrait, feeling that it did not capture his wife's beauty. Citing its large scale and intimate setting, the painting has been described as one of Courbet's most unusual works. The painting was eventually acquired by the Louisine Havemeyer and later donated by the Havemeyer Collection to the Metropolitan Museum of Art.

References

External link

1857 paintings
Paintings by Gustave Courbet
Paintings in the collection of the Metropolitan Museum of Art